Lieutenant-General Davidson Masuku  (8 March 1940 - 17 April 2000) was a South African military commander and physician.  He joined Umkhonto weSizwe (MK), the military wing of the African National Congress, and was its Chief of Health Services from 1993 to 1994, when MK was incorporated into the South African National Defence Force.

He commanded the South African Military Health Service, as Surgeon-General, from 1997 to 2000.

Medical career
He was trained as a doctor in Russia and qualified in 1981 as a surgeon.

Awards and decorations

See also
 List of South African military chiefs
 South African Military Health Service

References

1940 births
2000 deaths
South African military doctors
UMkhonto we Sizwe personnel
Members of the African National Congress
Knights of the Order of St John